Betty Rowlands (6 October 1923 – 29 July 2020) was a writer of cosy crime mystery novels set in the Cotswolds and Gloucestershire.

Personal life 
Born in Letchworth Garden City, Hertfordshire, to parents Arthur and Kathleen Beatrice Howard (née Brockelbank), her grandfather was Sir Ebenezer Howard, founder of the garden city movement and the first garden city, Letchworth, in 1903. Rowlands had two half brothers from her father's first marriage and the family moved to Bromley, Kent when she was young.

During the Second World War, working at the General Post Office Engineering Department, Betty met her first husband, Bert Jenner and married in 1942. They had three children. They divorced in 1957 and Rowlands married Len Rowlands in 1966, moving to Brimpsfield, Gloucestershire, in 1971.

Writing career 
Rowlands began writing seriously when she moved to the Cotswolds and joined local writing groups. At the same time she began teaching adults English as a second language. A number of her early short stories were read on the BBC in the late 1970s and in 1988 she won the Sunday Express / Veuve Clicquot Crime Short Story of the Year Award.

Her first novel was A Little Gentle Sleuthing, published in 1990, when Rowlands was in her late 60s. Her last novel was published in 2014, at the age of 90. She was a member of the Crime Writers' Association.

Bibliography

Melissa Craig series 

 A Little Gentle Sleuthing (London: Hodder and Stoughton, 1990 ).   Republished as Murder at Hawthorn Cottage (Bookouture, 2018 ).
 Finishing Touch (London: Hodder and Stoughton, 1991).   Republished as Murder in the Morning (Bookouture, 2018 ).
 Over the Edge (Hodder and Stoughton, 1992).   Republished as Murder on the Clifftops (Bookouture, 2018 ).
 Exhaustive Enquiries (Hodder and Stoughton, 1993 ).   Republished as Murder at the Manor Hotel (Bookouture, 2018 ).
 Malice Poetic (Hodder and Stoughton, 1995).   Republished as Murder on a Winter Afternoon (Bookouture, 2018 ).
 Deadly Legacy (Hodder and Stoughton, 1995 ).   Republished as Murder in the Orchard (Bookouture, 2019 ).
 Smiling at Death (Hodder and Stoughton, 1996 ).   Republished as Murder at Larkfield Barn (Bookouture, 2019 ).
 The Cherry Pickers (Hodder and Stoughton, 1998 ).  Republished as Murder in Langley Woods (Bookouture, 2019 ).
 The Man at the Window (Hodder and Stoughton, 2000).  Republished as Murder at Benbury Brook (Bookouture, 2019 ).
 The Fourth Suspect (Hodder and Stoughton, 2001 ).  Republished as Murder at the Old House (Bookouture, 2019 ).
 No Laughing Matter (Hodder and Stoughton, 2003 ).  Republished as Murder in the Dining Room (Bookouture, 2019 ).
 Sweet Venom (Hodder and Stoughton, 2004 ).  Republished as Murder in a Country Garden (Bookouture, 2019 ).

Sukey Reynolds Series 

 An Inconsiderate Death (Severn House Publishers, 1997 ).   Republished as Death at Hazel House (Bookouture, 2019 ).
 Death at Dearley Manor (Severn House Publishers, 1998 ).   Also (Bookouture, 2019 ).
 Copycat (Severn House Publishers, 1999 ).   Republished as Death at Beacon Cottage (Bookouture, 2019 ).
 Touch Me Not (Severn House Publishers, 2001 ).   Republished as Death at Burwell Farm (Bookouture, 2019 ).
 Dirty Work (Severn House Publishers, 2003).   Republished as Death at Ivy House (Bookouture, 2019 ).
 Deadly Obsession (Severn House Publishers, 2004).   Republished as Death on a Summer Morning (Bookouture, 2019 ).
 Party to Murder (Severn House Publishers, 2005 ).   Republished as Death under the Apple Tree (Bookouture, 2019 ).
 Alpha, Beta, Gamma... Dead (Severn House Publishers, 2007 ).   Republished as Death at The Mariners Hotel (Bookouture, 2019 ).
 Smokescreen (Severn House Publishers, 2008 ).   Republished as Death at the Library (Bookouture, 2019 ).
 A Fool There Was (Severn House Publishers, 2009).   Republished as Death on Clevedon Beach (Bookouture, 2019 ).
 Miss Minchin Dies (Severn House Publishers, 2010).   Republished as Death in the Village (Bookouture, 2019 ).
 Unnatural Wastage (Severn House Publishers, 2012).   Republished as Death as Sycamore House (Bookouture, 2019 ).
 The Scent of Death (Severn House Publishers, 2014 ).   Republished as Death at Sandy Bay (Bookouture, 2019 ).

Standalone novels 
Hive of Bees (Severn House Publishers, 1996 ).

References

External links 

 Rowlands, Betty 1923- | Encyclopedia.com

English crime writers
Writers from Bristol
English women novelists
Crime Writers' Association
20th-century English women writers
20th-century English writers
21st-century English women writers
1923 births
2020 deaths